The 1940 Saint Louis Billikens football team was an American football team that represented Saint Louis University as an independent during the 1940 college football season. In its first season under head coach Dukes Duford, the team compiled a 3–6–1 record and was outscored by a total of 113 to 88. The team played its home games at Edward J. Walsh Memorial Stadium in St. Louis.

Schedule

References

Saint Louis
Saint Louis Billikens football seasons
Saint Louis Billikens football